NASCAR in Primetime is a television program on ABC. It is a behind-the-scenes look at the preparation, logistics, drama and competition of NASCAR.

Each episode of the show follows three teams and drivers during the '07 NASCAR season, including the #01 of Mark Martin, the #31 of Jeff Burton, the #42 of Juan Pablo Montoya and the #70 of Johnny Sauter.

Other personalities, such as Montoya's wife Connie Montoya, and Sauter's crew chief, Bootie Barker, are also figures in the show.

Episodes have revolved around each team's experience at a single race. Episode one was the Kobalt Tools 500 at Atlanta. Episode two was the Food City 500 at Bristol, etc.

The show premiered August 15, 2007, at 10p.m. Eastern/Pacific Time, 9p.m. Central/Mountain Time.  The program is produced by ABC News in cooperation with NASCAR Images.

See also
 NASCAR on ESPN

Primetime
ABC Sports
ABC News
2007 American television series debuts
2000s American reality television series
American Broadcasting Company original programming
2007 American television series endings